Grewia ferruginea is a species of flowering plant in the family Malvaceae, widespread in Ethiopia, and also found in Sudan, Eritrea, and Kenya. Local people in Ethiopia feed it to cows suffering from retained placentas, as aids in placental expulsion.

References

ferruginea
Flora of Ethiopia
Flora of Eritrea
Flora of Kenya
Flora of Sudan
Plants described in 1847